The 1931-32 French Rugby Championship was won by le Lyon OU that defeated Narbonne in the final. The Championship was contested by 40 teams divided in eight pools of five.

Per the second year, the Championship was organized without the clubs of the Union française de rugby amateur who arranged their own championship.

At the 12 dissidents of the previous year (Bayonne, Biarritz, Stade Bordelais, Carcassonne, Grenoble, Limoges, FC Lyon, Nantes, Pau, US Perpignan, Stade Français and Toulouse) joined Stadoceste Tarbais and US Narbonne, a new club.

In the championship there were seven newcomer Gujan-Mestras, SU Lorrain (Nancy), Peyrehorade, US Romans-Péage, FC Saint-Claude, La Teste and SC Toulouse.

First round

Second round

Quarterfinals

Semifinals

Final

Other competitions

The first edition of Challenge Yves du Manoir was won by Agen, first of the pool ahead of Lyon OU second.

The Championship "Honneur revient" was won by Cercle Sportif Villefranche-sur-Saône that beat Chalon 3 - 0

In the Promotion Championship, the CS Lons beat US Coursan 10 - 3

The tournament of UFRA (Union française de rugby amateur) was won by Stade Toulousain

References 
 L’Humanité and the Figaro, 1931-1932
 Compte rendu de la finale de 1932, sur lnr.fr
 Finalesrugby.com

1932
France
Championship